

Events 
Below, the events of the First World War have the "WWI" prefix.

January 

 January 1 – The British Royal Army Medical Corps carries out the first successful blood transfusion, using blood that had been stored and cooled.
 January 9 – WWI: Gallipoli Campaign: The last British troops are evacuated from Gallipoli, as the Ottoman Empire prevails over a joint British and French operation to capture Constantinople.
 January 10 – WWI: Erzurum Offensive: Russia defeats the Ottoman Empire.
 January 12 – The Gilbert and Ellice Islands Colony, part of the British Empire, is established in present-day Tuvalu and Kiribati.
 January 13 – WWI: Battle of Wadi: Ottoman Empire forces defeat the British, during the Mesopotamian campaign in modern-day Iraq.
 January 29 – WWI: Paris is bombed by German zeppelins.
 January 31 – WWI: An attack is planned on Verdun, France.

February 

 February 9 – 6.00 p.m. – Tristan Tzara "founds" the art movement Dadaism (according to Hans Arp).
 February 11
 Emma Goldman is arrested, for lecturing on birth control in the United States.
 The Baltimore Symphony Orchestra presents its first concert in the United States.
 The Romanian football club Sportul Studențesc is founded in Bucharest.
 February 12 – WWI – Battle of Salaita Hill (East African Campaign): South African and other British Empire troops fail to take a German East African defensive position.
 February 21 – WWI: The Battle of Verdun begins in France.

March 

 March 8–9 – Mexican Revolution: Pancho Villa leads about 500 Mexican raiders in an attack against Columbus, New Mexico, killing 12 U.S. soldiers. A garrison of the U.S. 13th Cavalry Regiment fights back and drives them away.
 March 10 – The McMahon–Hussein Correspondence concludes with an understanding that the United Kingdom would recognise Arab independence in return for Hussein bin Ali, Sharif of Mecca, launching the Arab Revolt against the Ottoman Empire.
 March 15 – United States President Woodrow Wilson sends 12,000 United States troops over the U.S.–Mexico border to pursue Pancho Villa; the 13th Cavalry regiment enters Mexican territory.
 March 16 – Mexican Revolution: The U.S. 7th and 10th Cavalry regiments under John J. Pershing cross the border, to join the hunt for Villa.
 March 22 – The temporary Emperor of China, Yuan Shikai, abdicates the throne, and the Republic of China is restored once again.

April 

 April
 The toggle light switch is invented, by William J. Newton and Morris Goldberg.
 Korea Tungsten was founded in Daegu, as predecessor of leading steel product in Asia, POSCO (Pohang Steel Company).
 April 11 – WWI: The Egyptian Expeditionary Force begins the occupation of the Sinai Peninsula.
 April 22 – The Chinese troop transport  capsizes off the Chinese coast; at least 1,000 are killed.
 April 24–30 – The Easter Rising occurs in Ireland. Members of the Irish Republican Brotherhood proclaim an Irish Republic, and the Irish Volunteers and Irish Citizen Army occupy the General Post Office and other buildings in Dublin, before surrendering to the British Army.
 April 24–May 10 – Voyage of the James Caird: An open boat journey from Elephant Island in the South Shetland Islands to South Georgia in the southern Atlantic Ocean is undertaken by Sir Ernest Shackleton and five companions, to obtain rescue for the main body of the Imperial Trans-Antarctic Expedition, following the loss of its ship Endurance.
 April 27 – WWI: Gas attack at Hulluch in France: The 47th Brigade, 16th (Irish) Division is decimated, in one of the most heavily concentrated German gas attacks of the war.
 April 29 – WWI: Mesopotamian campaign – The Siege of Kut ends with the surrender of British Indian Army forces to the Ottoman Empire at Kut-al-Amara on the Tigris in Basra Vilayet.

May 

 May 16 
 United States Marines invade the Dominican Republic.
 Britain and France conclude the secret Sykes–Picot Agreement, which is to divide Arab areas of the Ottoman Empire, following the conclusion of WWI and the partitioning of the Ottoman Empire, into French and British spheres of influence.
 May 31–June 1 – WWI: Battle of Jutland, between the British Royal Navy's Grand Fleet and the Imperial German Navy's High Seas Fleet in the North Sea, the war's only large-scale clash of battleships. The result is tactically inconclusive, but British dominance of the North Sea is maintained.

June 

 June 4 – WWI: The Brusilov Offensive, the height of Russian operations in the war, begins with their breaking through Austro-Hungarian lines.
 June 5 – WWI:  sinks, having hit a mine off the Orkney Islands, Scotland, with Lord Kitchener aboard.
 June 10: The Arab Revolt against the Ottoman Empire, to create a single unified Arab state spanning from Aleppo to Aden, is formally declared by Hussein bin Ali, Sharif of Mecca.
 June 15 – U.S. President Woodrow Wilson signs a bill incorporating the Boy Scouts of America.
 June 24 - Mary Pickford, becomes the first movie star to sign a million-dollar contract, making her one of the highest-paid people in the world.

July 

 July 1–November 18 – WWI: Battle of the Somme, opening with explosion of the British Y Sap and Lochnagar mines and the Battle of Albert: More than one million soldiers die, with 57,470 British Empire casualties on the first day, 19,240 of them killed, the British Army's bloodiest day. The immediate result is tactically inconclusive.
 July 1–12 – Jersey Shore shark attacks of 1916: At least one shark attacks 5 swimmers along  of New Jersey coastline, resulting in 4 deaths and the survival of one youth, who requires limb amputation. This event is the inspiration for author Peter Benchley, over half a century later, to write Jaws.
 July 2 – WWI: Battle of Erzincan – Russian forces defeat troops of the Ottoman Empire in Armenia.
 July 15 – In Seattle, William Boeing incorporates Pacific Aero Products (later renamed Boeing).
 July 15–19 – WWI: Battle of Delville Wood – 766 men from the South African Brigade are killed, in South Africa's biggest loss during the First World War.
 July 19–20 – WWI: Battle of Fromelles – An attack by Australian and British troops is repulsed by the German army, with heavy casualties.
 July 22 – Preparedness Day Bombing: In San Francisco, a bomb explodes on Market Street during a Preparedness Day parade, killing 10 and injuring 40; Warren Billings and Tom Mooney are later wrongly convicted of it.
 July 26 – WWI: East African Campaign – The German armed ship SMS Graf von Goetzen scuttles herself on Lake Tanganyika.
 July 29 – Matheson Fire: In Ontario, Canada, a lightning strike ignites a forest fire that destroys the towns of Cochrane and Matheson, killing 233.
 July 30 – German agents cause the Black Tom explosion in Jersey City, New Jersey, an act of sabotage destroying an ammunition depot and killing at least 7 people.

August 

 August – Robert Baden-Powell publishes The Wolf Cub's Handbook in the U.K., establishing the basis of the junior section of the Scouting movement, the Wolf Cubs (modern-day Cub Scouts).
 August 3–5 – WWI: Sinai and Palestine Campaign – Battle of Romani: British Imperial troops secure victory over a joint Ottoman-German force.
 August 7 – WWI:
 Portugal joins the Allies.
 French and British forces make an unopposed entry into German-controlled Togoland; on December 27 the country is partitioned between the two allies.
 August 9 – Lassen Volcanic National Park is established in California.
 August 15 – Club Atlas is founded as an association football club in Guadalajara, Mexico, by English-educated players.
 August 16 – The Migratory Bird Treaty between Canada and the United States is signed.
 August 17 (August 4 O.S.) – WWI: The Treaty of Bucharest is signed secretly between Romania and the Entente Powers, stipulating the conditions under which Romania agrees to join the war on their side, particularly territorial promises in Austria-Hungary. 
 August 21 – WWI: Peru declares neutrality.
 August 25 – U.S. President Woodrow Wilson signs legislation, creating the National Park Service.
 August 27 – WWI: The Kingdom of Romania declares war on the Central Powers, entering the war on the side of the Allies.
 August 28 – WWI:
 Germany declares war on Romania.
 Italy declares war on Germany.
 August 29 – The United States passes the Philippine Autonomy Act.
 August 30 – The crew of the Imperial Trans-Antarctic Expedition's  is rescued from Elephant Island.

September 

 September 1 – Bulgaria declares war on Romania, going on to take Dobruja.
 September 2 – WWI: British pilot Leefe Robinson becomes the first to shoot down a German airship over Britain.
 September 4 – WWI: East African Campaign – Dar es Salaam surrenders to British Empire forces, securing them control of the Central Line of railway through German East Africa.
 September 5 – D. W. Griffith's film Intolerance: Love's Struggle Through the Ages is released in the United States.
 September 6 – The first true self-service grocery store, Piggly Wiggly, is founded in Memphis, Tennessee, by Clarence Saunders, opening 5 days later.
 September 11 – A mechanical failure causes the central span of the Quebec Bridge, a cantilever-type structure, to crash into the Saint Lawrence River for the second time, killing 13 workers.
 September 13 – Mary, a circus elephant, is hanged in the town of Erwin, Tennessee for killing her handler, Walter "Red" Eldridge.
 September 15–22 – WWI – Battle of Flers–Courcelette, France: The battle is significant for the first use of the tank in warfare; also for the debut of the Canadian and New Zealand Divisions in the Battle of the Somme.
 September 19 – WWI: East African Campaign – Belgian troops occupy Tabora in German East Africa.
 September 27 – Iyasu V of Ethiopia is deposed in a palace coup, in favour of his aunt Zewditu.
 September 29 – John D. Rockefeller becomes the first person ever to reach a nominal personal fortune of US$1 billion

October 

 October 7 – the Georgia Tech and Cumberland College football game ends in a score of 222-0.
 October 12 – Hipólito Yrigoyen is elected President of Argentina.
 October 14 – Perm State University is founded in Russia.
 October 16 – Margaret Sanger opens the first U.S. birth control clinic, a forerunner of Planned Parenthood.
 October 20 – Black Friday (1916): A violent and deadly storm hits Lake Erie in the United States.
 October 21 – Friedrich Adler shoots Count Karl von Stürgkh, Minister-President of Austria.
 October 24 – Vladimir Lenin's Call to Power
 October 27 – Battle of Segale: Negus Mikael of Wollo, marching on the Ethiopian capital in support of his son Emperor Iyasu V, is defeated by Fitawrari Habte Giyorgis, securing the throne for Empress Zewditu.
 October 28 – 1916 Pioneer Exhibition Game: game of Australian rules football contested at Queen's Club, West Kensington, London, by two teams of elite footballers selected from men serving in the First AIF at the time.

November 

 November 1
 Pavel Milyukov delivers his "stupidity or treason" speech in the Russian State Duma, precipitating the downfall of the Boris Stürmer government.
 The first 40-hour work week officially begins, in the Endicott-Johnson factories of Western New York. 
 November 5
 The Kingdom of Poland (1916–18) is proclaimed by a joint act of the emperors of Germany and Austria.
 Everett massacre: An armed confrontation in Everett, Washington, between local authorities and members of the Industrial Workers of the World results in seven deaths.
 Honan Chapel, Cork, Ireland, a product of the Irish Arts and Crafts movement (1894–1925), is dedicated.
 November 7
 1916 United States presidential election: Democratic President Woodrow Wilson narrowly defeats Republican Charles Evans Hughes, when California is called a week after Election Day.
 Republican Jeannette Rankin of Montana becomes the first woman elected to the United States House of Representatives.
 Radio station 2XG, located in the Highbridge section of New York City, makes the first audio broadcast of presidential election returns.
 November 13 – Prime Minister of Australia Billy Hughes is expelled from the Labor Party, over his support for conscription.
 November 18 – WWI – Battle of the Somme: In France, British Expeditionary Force commander Douglas Haig calls off the battle, which started on July 1.
 November 21
 Emperor Franz Joseph I of Austria dies of pneumonia at the Schönbrunn Palace, Vienna, aged 86, after a reign of 68 years and is succeeded by his grandnephew Charles I. 
 WWI: Hospital ship HMHS Britannic, designed as the third  for White Star Line, sinks in the Kea Channel of the Aegean Sea after hitting a mine; 30 lives are lost. At 48,158 gross register tons, she is the largest ship lost during the war.
 November 23 – WWI: Eastern Front – Bucharest, the capital of Romania, is occupied by troops of the Central Powers.

December 

 December 12 – "White Friday": In the Dolomites, 100 avalanches bury 18,000 Austrian and Italian soldiers.
 December 16 – Robert Baden-Powell gives the first public display of the new Wolf Cub section of Scouting at Caxton Hall, Westminster.
 December 18 – WWI: The Battle of Verdun ends in France with German troops defeated.
 December 21 – WWI: El Arish occupied by the British Empire Desert Column during advance across the Sinai Peninsula.
 December 22 – The British Sopwith Camel aircraft makes its maiden flight. It is designed to counter the German Fokker aircraft.
 December 23 – WWI: The Desert Column captures the Ottoman garrison during the Battle of Magdhaba.
 December 30
 Humberto Gómez and his mercenaries seize Arauca in Colombia and declare the Republic of Arauca. He proceeds to pillage the region before fleeing to Venezuela.
 (December 17 Old Style) – The mystic Grigori Rasputin is murdered in Saint Petersburg.
 December 31 – The Hampton Terrace Hotel in North Augusta, South Carolina, one of the largest and most luxurious hotels in the United States at the time, burns to the ground.

Date unknown 
 The 1916 Summer Olympics are cancelled in Berlin, Germany.
 Food is rationed in Germany.
 Ferdinand de Saussure's Cours de linguistique générale is collected posthumously and published.
 Oxycodone, a narcotic painkiller closely related to codeine, is first synthesized in Germany.
 Ernst Rüdin publishes his initial results on the genetics of schizophrenia.
 Louis Enricht claims he has a substitute for gasoline.
 Rodeo's first side-delivery bucking chute is designed and made by the Bascom brothers (Raymond, Mel, and Earl) and their father, John W. Bascom, at Welling, Alberta, Canada.
 Gustav Holst composes The Planets, Opus 32.
 Bray Studios begins the Farmer Al Falfa series, the first of the Terrytoons.
 The Society of Motion Picture and Television Engineers is founded in the United States as the Society of Motion Picture Engineers.
 Ishikawajima Automobile Manufacturing, as predecessor of Isuzu, a truck brand in Japan, was founded.

Sport 
 March 30 - National Hockey Association's Montreal Canadiens win their First Stanley Cup by defeating the Pacific Coast Hockey Association's  Portland Rosebuds 3 games to 2. All Games were played at Montreal's Montreal Arena.
 Due to the outbreak of World War I, the 1916 Summer Olympics in Berlin, Germany, is cancelled.

In fiction 
 In the 1941 film Citizen Kane, Charles Foster Kane runs for New York governor and loses. Also in 1916, Emily Monroe Norton divorces him and, in either this year or in 1917, he marries Susan Alexander.

Births

January 

 January 1
 Giuseppe Aquari, Italian film cinematographer (d. 1982)
 Italo Viglianesi, Italian trade unionist politician and syndicalist (d. 1995)
 January 2 – Joseph W. Schmitt, American aircraft mechanic and spacesuit technician (d. 2017)
 January 3
 Maxene Andrews, American singer (The Andrews Sisters) (d. 1995)
 Betty Furness, American actress and consumer activist (d. 1994)
 Bernard Greenhouse, American cellist (d. 2011)
 Erik Ågren, Swedish boxer (d. 1985)
 Warren King, American cartoonist (d. 1978)
 January 4
 Princess Niloufer (d. 1989)
 Sidney Siegel, American psychologist (d. 1961)
 January 5 
 Alfred Ryder, American film, radio and television actor (d. 1995)
 Wilhelm Szewczyk, Polish writer, poet, literary critic and translator (d. 1991)
 January 7 
 Elena Ceaușescu, Romanian politician, First Lady of Romania and Deputy Prime Minister of Romania (d. 1989)
 Paul Keres, Estonian chess player (d. 1975)
 January 9 – Peter Twinn, English mathematician and WWII code-breaker (d. 2004)
 January 10 
 Sune Bergström, Swedish biochemist, recipient of the Nobel Prize in Physiology or Medicine (d. 2004)
 Bernard Binlin Dadié, Ivorian novelist, playwright, poet, and Minister of Culture (d. 2019) 
 Richard Münch, German actor (d. 1987)
 January 12
 Ruth R. Benerito, American chemist (d. 2013)
 P. W. Botha, 9th President of South Africa (d. 2006)
 Mary Wilson, Lady Wilson of Rievaulx, English poet (d. 2018)
 January 15 – Hugh Gibb, English drummer and bandleader (d. 1992)
 January 17 
 Peter Frelinghuysen Jr., American politician (d. 2011)
 Tatyana Karpova, Soviet and Russian actress (d. 2018)
 January 18 – Silviu Brucan, Romanian author and politician (d. 2006)
 January 19 – Harry Huskey, American computer designer (d. 2017)
 January 22 – Henri Dutilleux, French composer (d. 2013)
 January 23 – David Douglas Duncan, American photojournalist (d. 2018)
 January 24
 Rafael Caldera, 39th President of Venezuela (d. 2009)
 Marvin Creamer, American sailor (d. 2020)
 Arnoldo Foà, Italian actor (d. 2014)
 Daphne Lorraine Gum, Australian educator (d. 2017)
 January 27 – Stjepan Filipović, a People's Hero of Yugoslavia (d. 1942)
 January 28 – Dottie Hunter, Canadian baseball player (d. 2005)
 January 31 – Sangoulé Lamizana, 2nd President and Prime Minister of Burkina Faso (d. 2005)

February 

 February 10 – Louis Guttman, American-born Israeli university professor (d. 1987)
 February 11 – Ivan Hristov Bashev, Bulgarian Foreign Minister (d. 1971)
 February 12 – Damián Iguacén Borau, Spanish Roman Catholic prelate (d. 2020)
 February 13 – John Reed, British actor and opera singer (d. 2010)
 February 14
 Marcel Bigeard, French military officer (d. 2010)
 Sally Gray, English actress (d. 2006)
 Denham Harman, American gerontologist (d. 2014)
 Edward Platt, American actor (d. 1974)
 Charles Wycliffe Joiner, American judge (d. 2017)
 Masaki Kobayashi, Japanese film director (d. 1996)
 February 15 
 Ernest Millington, English politician (d. 2009)
 Mary Jane Croft, American actress (d. 1999)
 Dingiri Banda Wijetunga, 4th President and 9th Prime Minister of Sri Lanka (d. 2008)
 February 16 – Karel Dufek, Czechoslovak diplomat (d. 2009)
 February 18 – Maria Altmann, Austrian Holocaust survivor and heiress (d. 2011)
 February 20 – Jean Erdman, American dancer (d. 2020)
 February 23 – Retta Scott, first woman to receive screen credit as an animator at the Walt Disney Animation Studios (d. 1990)
 February 26
Jackie Gleason, American comedian, actor and musician (d. 1987)
 Preacher Roe, American baseball player (d. 2008)
 February 28
 Svend Asmussen, Danish jazz violinist (d. 2017)
 Cesar Climaco, Filipino politician, Mayor of Zamboanga (d. 1984)
 Frank Crean, Australian politician (d. 2008)

March 

 March 1 – Emelyn Whiton, American Olympic sailor (d. 1962)
 March 2 – George E. Bria, Italian-American journalist (d. 2017)
 March 3 – Paul Halmos, Hungarian-born mathematician (d. 2006)
 March 4
 William Alland, American actor, producer, writer and director (d. 1997)
 Giorgio Bassani, Italian writer (d. 2000)
 Hans Eysenck, German-born psychologist (d. 1997)
 March 5 – Jack Hamm, American cartoonist (d. 1996)
 March 6 – Rochelle Hudson, American actress (d. 1972)
 March 7 – Marie-Thérèse Bourquin, Belgian lawyer (d. 2018)
 March 10 – Ethel Bush, British police officer (d. 2016)
 March 11 – Harold Wilson, Prime Minister of the United Kingdom (d. 1995)
 March 13
 Lindy Boggs, American politician (d. 2013)
 Jacque Fresco, American futurist and designer (d. 2017)
 John Aspinwall Roosevelt, American businessman and philanthropist (d. 1981)
 Robert O. Peterson, American businessman and philanthropist (d. 1994)
 March 14 – Horton Foote, American writer (d. 2009)
 March 15
 Frank Coghlan Jr., American actor (d. 2009)
 Harry James, American musician and band leader (d. 1983)
 March 16 
 Mercedes McCambridge, American actress (d. 2004)
 Tsutomu Yamaguchi, Japanese survivor of Hiroshima and Nagasaki atomic bombings (d. 2010)
 March 17 
 Lyle Smith, American football coach (d. 2017)
 Volodia Teitelboim, Chilean author and politician (d. 2008)
 March 19 – Irving Wallace, American novelist (d. 1990)
 March 20 – Pierre Messmer, French politician (d. 2007)
 March 24 
 Donald Hamilton, Swedish writer (d. 2006)
 Anna Maria Bottini, Italian actress (d. 2020)
 March 26
 Christian B. Anfinsen, American chemist, Nobel Prize laureate (d. 1995)
 Dai Zijin, Chinese aviator (d. 2017)
 Harry Rabinowitz, British film composer and conductor (d. 2016)
 March 29
 Sam Beazley, British actor (d. 2017)
 Peter Geach, British philosopher (d. 2013)
 Abu Sadat Mohammad Sayem, 6th President of Bangladesh (d. 1997)
 Eugene McCarthy, U.S. Senator from Minnesota and Presidential candidate (d. 2005)
 March 31 – Lucille Bliss, American voice actor (d. 2012)

April 

 April 1
 John Holter, American toolmaker and inventor (d. 2003)
 Balilla Lombardi, Italian football player (d. 1987)
 April 2 – Menachem Porush, member of Israeli Knesset for Agudat Yisrael (d. 2010)
 April 3
 Herb Caen, American journalist (d. 1997)
 Peter Gowland, American photographer (d. 2010)
 Louiguy, Spanish-French musician of Italian extraction (d. 1991)
 April 4 
 David White, American actor (d. 1990)
 Nikola Ljubičić, 10th President of Serbia (d. 2005)
 April 5
 Albert Henry Ottenweller, American bishop (d. 2012)
 Gregory Peck, American actor (d. 2003)
 Carmen Silva, Brazilian actress (d. 2008)
 April 10 – Lee Jung-seob, Korean oil painter (d. 1956)
 April 11 
 Alberto Ginastera, Argentine composer (d. 1983)
 Armando León Bejarano, Mexican politician (d. 2016)
 April 12
 Beverly Cleary, American children's book author (d. 2021)
 Benjamin Libet, American pioneering scientist in the field of human consciousness (d. 2007)
 Movita Castaneda, American actress (d. 2015)
 April 14 – Pehr Victor Edman, Swedish chemist (d.1977)
 April 15
 Alfred S. Bloomingdale, American department store heir (d. 1982)
 Helene Hanff, American writer and critic (d. 1997)
 Mikiel Fsadni, Maltese friar and historian (d. 2013)
 April 16 – Hon Sui Sen, Malaysian-Singaporean politician (d. 1983)
 April 17
 Sirimavo Bandaranaike, Sri Lankan politician (d. 2000)
 A. Thiagarajah, Sri Lankan Tamil teacher and politician (d. 1981)
 Win Maung, 3rd President of Myanmar (d. 1989)
 April 18
 Carl Burgos, American comic book artist (d. 1984)
 José Joaquín Trejos Fernández, President of Costa Rica (d. 2010)
 April 19 
 Bruno Chizzo, Italian association footballer (d. 1969)
 Delio Rodríguez, Spanish road racing cyclist and sprinter (d. 1994)
 April 21
 Walter Berg, German footballer (d. 1949)
 April 22 
 Yehudi Menuhin, American-born violinist (d. 1999)
 Yvette Lundy, French resistance fighter (d. 2019)
 April 24
 Stanley Kauffmann, American film critic (d. 2013)
 Lou Thesz, American professional wrestler (d. 2002)
 April 25 – R. J. Rushdoony, American founder of Christian Reconstructionism (d. 2001)
 April 26
 Dorothy Salisbury Davis, American writer (d. 2014)
 Vic Perrin, American voice actor (d. 1989)
 Paulette Coquatrix, French costume designer (d. 2018)
 Ken Wallis, British aviator, engineer, and inventor (d. 2013)
 Werner Bischof, Swiss photographer and photojournalist (d. 1954)
 George Tuska, American comic strip artist (d. 2009)
 April 27 – Enos Slaughter, American baseball player (d. 2002)
 April 28 – Ferruccio Lamborghini, Italian automobile manufacturer (d. 1993)
 April 29 – Ramón Amaya Amador, Honduran author (d. 1966) 
 April 30 
 Claude Elwood Shannon, American information theorist (d. 2001)
 Robert Shaw, American conductor (d. 1999)

May 

 May 1 – Glenn Ford, Canadian actor (d. 2006)
 May 4 – Jane Jacobs, née Butzner, American-born urban activist (d. 2006)
 May 5 – Zail Singh, Indian politician and 7th President of India (d. 1994)
 May 6
 Adriana Caselotti, American actress (d. 1997)
 Robert H. Dicke, American experimental physicist (d. 1997)
 Sif Ruud, Swedish actress (d. 2011)
 May 8
 Chinmayananda, Indian spiritual leader (d. 1993)
 Jens Risom, Danish American furniture designer (d. 2016)
 João Havelange, Brazilian industrialist and football league president (d. 2016)
 May 10 – Milton Babbitt, American composer (d. 2011)
 May 11 – Camilo José Cela, Spanish writer, Nobel Prize laureate (d. 2002)
 May 14 – Sammy Luftspring, Canadian boxer (d. 2000)
 Del Moore, American actor, comedian and radio announcer (d. 1970)
 May 15 
 Vera Gebuhr, Danish actress (d. 2014)
 Abbott Pattison, American sculptor and abstract artist (d. 1999)
 May 16 
 Adriana Caselotti, American Actress, Voice Actress and Singer (d. 1997)
 Ephraim Katzir, 4th President of Israel (d. 2009)
 Carlos Aldunate Lyon, Colombian lawyer, educator and activist (d. 2018)
 May 17
 Jenő Fock, 49th Prime Minister of Hungary (d. 2001)
 Lenka Reinerová, Czech writer (d. 2008)
 May 18 – Miriam Goldberg, American newspaper publisher (d. 2017)
 May 20
 Owen Chadwick, British author and historian (d. 2015)
 Trebisonda Valla, Italian athlete (d. 2006)
 May 21
 Louis Crump, American politician (d. 2019)
 Dennis Day, American singer and actor (d. 1988)
 Leonard Manasseh, British architect (d. 2017)
 Lydia Mendoza, American musician (d. 2007)
 Tinus Osendarp, Dutch runner (d. 2002)
 Harold Robbins, American novelist (d. 1997)
 Tan Siew Sin, Malaysian minister of Commerce and Industry (d. 1988)
 May 26
 Halil İnalcık, Turkish historian (d. 2016)
 Henriette Roosenburg, Dutch journalist (d. 1972)
 May 31
 Bert Haanstra, Dutch filmmaker (d. 1997)
 Bernard Lewis, British-American historian (d. 2018)

June 

 June 3 – Jack Manning, American film, stage and television actor (d. 2009)
 June 4 – Robert F. Furchgott, American chemist, recipient of the Nobel Prize in Physiology or Medicine (d. 2009)
 June 5 – Eddie Joost, baseball player and manager (d. 2011)
 June 6 – Hamani Diori, 1st President of Niger (d. 1989)
 June 8 – Francis Crick, English molecular biologist, recipient of the Nobel Prize in Physiology or Medicine (d. 2004)
 June 9
 Jurij Brězan, Sorbian writer (d. 2006)
 Robert McNamara, 8th United States Secretary of Defense (d. 2009)
 June 11 – Bob Berry, New Zealand dendrologist (d. 2018)
 June 12 – Raúl Héctor Castro, American politician (d. 2015)
 June 13 – Ronald Atkins, Welsh politician (d. 2020)
 June 14 – Dorothy McGuire, American actress (d. 2001)
 June 15
 Olga Erteszek, American undergarment designer and lingerie company owner (d. 1989)
 Horacio Salgán, Argentine tango musician (d. 2016)
 Herbert A. Simon, American economist, Nobel Prize laureate (d. 2001)
 June 16 – Phil Chambers, American actor (d. 1993)
 June 17 – Einar Englund, Finnish composer (d. 1999)
 June 18 
 Julio César Turbay Ayala, 25th President of Colombia (d. 2005)
 Roman Toi, Estonian composer, choir conductor, and organist (d. 2018)
 June 21 
 Tchan Fou-li, Chinese photographer (d. 2018)
 Herbert Friedman, American physicist (d. 2000)
 June 22 
 Anne Olivier Bell, English literary editor and art scholar (d. 2018)
 Richard Eastham, American actor (d. 2005)
 Emil Fackenheim, noted Jewish philosopher and Reform rabbi (d. 2003)
 June 23
 Len Hutton, English cricketer (d. 1990)
 Irene Worth, American actress (d. 2002)
 Al G. Wright, American bandleader and conductor (d. 2020)
 June 24
 Saloua Raouda Choucair, Lebanese painter and sculptor (d. 2017)
 Lidia Wysocka, American actress (d. 2006)
 William B. Saxbe, American politician (d. 2010)
 June 25 – Thomas Reddin, American police (d. 2004)
 June 26 
 Dennis Filmer, Malaysian sports shooter (d. 1981)
 Alvin Wistert, American football player (d. 2005)
 June 27 
 Max Müller, Swiss cross-country skier (d. 2019)
 Ivy Cooke, Jamaican educator (d. 2017)
 June 28
 Richard Best, British film editor (d. 2004)
 John Evelyn Anderson, British Army officer (d. 2007)
 June 29 – Ruth Warrick, American actress (d. 2005)

July 

 July 1
 Olivia de Havilland, Japanese-born British-American film actress (d. 2020)
 Lawrence Halprin, American architect (d. 2009)
 Thomas Hamilton-Brown, South African boxer
 July 2
 Reino Kangasmäki, Finnish wrestler (d. 2010)
 Alec Hill, Australian military historian (d. 2008)
 Zélia Gattai, Brazilian author and photographer (d. 2008)
 Hans-Ulrich Rudel, German pilot (d. 1982)
 Ken Curtis, American screen actor and singer (d. 1991)
 July 3 – John Kundla, American basketball coach (d. 2017)
 July 4
 Iva Toguri D'Aquino ("Tokyo Rose"), American propaganda broadcaster (d. 2006)
 Adam Curle, British academic and peace activist (d. 2006)
 Naseem Banu, Indian actress (d. 2002) 
 Fernand Leduc, Canadian painter (d. 2014)
 July 5
 Lívia Rév, Hungarian classical pianist (d. 2018)
 Ivor Powell, Welsh footballer (d. 2012)
 July 6 
 Harold Norse, American writer (d. 2009)
 Hugh Gibbons, Irish Fianna Fáil politician (d. 2007)
 Don R. Christensen, American animator, cartoonist, illustrator, writer and inventor (d. 2006)
 July 7 – Werner G. Scharff, American arts patron and fashion designer (d. 2006)
 July 8 
 Marion Hartzog Smoak, American lawyer and politician (d. 2020)
 Ronald R. Van Stockum, American writer (d. 2022)
 Jean Rouverol, American actress, screenwriter and author (d. 2017)
 Otto Luedeke, American cyclist (d. 2005)
 July 9 – Edward Heath, Prime Minister of the United Kingdom (d. 2005)
 July 10 – Nicholas D'Antonio Salza, American bishop (d. 2009)
 July 11
 Mortimer Caplin, American lawyer and educator (d. 2019)
 Hans Maier, Dutch water polo player (d. 2018)
 Aleksandr Mikhailovich Prokhorov, Russian physicist, Nobel laureate (d. 2002)
 Reg Varney, British actor (d. 2008)
 Gough Whitlam, 21st Prime Minister of Australia (d. 2014)
 July 14 
 Franco Montoro, Brazilian politician and lawyer (d. 1999)
 Natalia Ginzburg, Italian author (d. 1991)
 July 15 
 Sumner Gerard, American politician and diplomat (d. 2005)
 Les Dye, American football player (d. 2000)
 July 16 
 Victor Fontana, Brazilian engineer, businessman and politician (d. 2017)
 Sudono Salim, Indonesian-Chinese businessman (d. 2012)
 July 17 
 Eleanor Hadley, American economist and policymaker (d. 2007)
 Henning Brandis, German physician and microbiologist (d. 2004)
 July 18
 Charles Kittel, American physicist (d. 2019)
 L. Patrick Gray III, American Federal Bureau of Investigation director (d. 2005)
 Ed Cifers, American football end (d. 2005)
 Sid Kiel, South African doctor and cricketer (d. 2007)
 July 19 – Phil Cavarretta, baseball player (d. 2010)
 July 20 
 Ersilio Tonini, Italian Cardinal of the Catholic Church (d. 2013)
 Hans von Blixen-Finecke Jr., Swedish officer and horse rider (d. 2005)
 July 21
 Douglas Freeman, English cricketer (d. 2013)
 Sergeant Stubby, World War I American hero  war dog (d. 1926)
 July 22
 Irene Galitzine, Russian-Georgian fashion designer (d. 2006)
 William A. Culpepper, American judge (d. 2015)
 William Harper, Rhodesian politician (d. 2006)
 Marcel Cerdan, French boxer (d. 1949)
 July 23 – Sandra Gould, American actress (d. 1999)
 July 25 – Fred Lasswell, American cartoonist (d. 2001)
 July 27 
 Elizabeth Hardwick, American literary critic and novelist (d. 2007)
 Keenan Wynn, American actor (d. 1986)
 July 28 – David Brown, American producer (d. 2010)
 July 29 – Rupert Hamer, Australian politician and Premier of Victoria (d. 2004)
 July 30 – Dick Wilson, American actor (d. 2007)
 July 31
 Bill Todman, American game show producer (d. 1979)
 Ignacio Trelles, Mexican football player and coach (d. 2020)

August 

 August 1 
 Fiorenzo Angelini, Italian Cardinal (d. 2014)
 Olimpio Bizzi, Italian racing cyclist (d. 1976)
 Edna Hughes, English competition swimmer (d. 1990)
 August 2 – Zein Al-Sharaf Talal, Queen of Jordan (d. 1994)
 August 3 – Hertha Feiler, Austrian actress (d. 1970)
 August 5 – Kermit Love, American puppeteer (d. 2008)
 August 6 – Dom Mintoff, 8th Prime Minister of Malta (d. 2012)
 August 7 
 Lawrence Picachy, Indian Jesuit priest (d. 1992)
 Rose Wolfe, Canadian social worker and philanthropist (d. 2016)
 August 8 – Shigeo Arai, Japanese freestyle swimmer (d. 1944)
 August 9 – Manea Mănescu, 50th Prime Minister of Romania (d. 2009)
 August 10 – Lorna McDonald, Australian historian and author (d. 2017)
 August 11
 Johnny Claes, English racing driver (d. 1956)
 William Coors, American executive (d. 2018)
 August 12 – Ralph Nelson, American film and television director, producer, writer, and actor (d. 1987)
 August 13 – Sybren Valkema, Dutch glass artist and teacher, and founder of the European Studio Glass Movement, also known as VRIJ GLAS. (d. 1996)
 August 14 
 Heinrich Prinz zu Sayn-Wittgenstein, German night fighter pilot and flying ace (d. 1944)
 Ralph de Toledano, American conservationist and author (d. 2007)
 August 16
 Edythe Wright, American singer (d. 1965) 
 Iggy Katona, American race car driver (d. 2003)
 August 18 – Neagu Djuvara, Romanian historian, essayist, and diplomat (d. 2018)
 August 19 – Dennis Poore, British entrepreneur, financier and racing driver (d. 1987)
 August 20 
 George Rosenkranz, Mexican co-inventor of oral contraceptive pill (d. 2019)
 Paul Felix Schmidt, Estonian chess player (d. 1984)
 August 21
 Frank O. Braynard, American maritime writer and historian (d. 2007)
 Geoffrey Keen, English actor (d. 2005)
 Bill Lee, American playback singer (d. 1980)
 Consuelo Velázquez, Mexican songwriter (d. 2005)
 August 22 
 Robert H. Krieble, American chemist (d. 1997)
 Joe Martinelli, American soccer forward (d. 1991)
 August 24
 Hal Smith, American actor (d. 1994)
 Léo Ferré, French-born Monégasque poet and composer (d. 1993)
 August 25
 Van Johnson, American actor (d. 2008)
 Frederick Chapman Robbins, American pediatrician and virologist (d. 2003)
 Saburō Sakai, Japanese fighter ace (d. 2000)
 August 27
 Martha Raye, American actress (d. 1994)
 Larry Thor, Canadian actor (d. 1976)
 Robert Van Eenaeme, Belgian cyclist (d. 1959)
 August 28 
 C. Wright Mills, American sociologist (d. 1962)
 Jack Vance, American writer (d. 2013)
 August 29 – Luther Davis, American screenwriter (d. 2008)
 August 30
 Shag Crawford, American baseball umpire (d. 2007)
 Kenneth Keith, Baron Keith of Castleacre, British life peer (d. 2004)
 August 31
 Daniel Schorr, American journalist (d. 2010)
 John S. Wold, American politician (d. 2017)

September 

 September 1
 Dorothy Cheney, American tennis player (d. 2014)
 Joseph Minish, American politician (d. 2007)
 September 3 – Tommy J. Smith, Australian trainer (d. 1998)
 September 5 
 Allan Louisy, 2nd Prime Minister of Saint Lucia (d. 2011)
 Frank Yerby, American writer (d. 1991)
 September 7 – Shen Panwen, Chinese chemist (d. 2017)
 September 12
 Leoncio Afonso, Spanish scientist (d. 2017)
 Edward Binns, American stage, film, and television actor (d. 1990)
 September 13 – Roald Dahl, Welsh-born author (d. 1990)
 September 14
 Eric Bentley, English-born American critic and playwright (d. 2020)
 John Heyer, Australian documentary filmmaker (d. 2001)
 September 15
 Margaret Lockwood, Indian-born English actress (d. 1990)
 Frederick C. Weyand, U.S. Army General (d. 2010)
 September 16 – Frank Leslie Walcott, Barbadian labour leader (d. 1999)
 September 17 – Mary Stewart, born Mary Rainbow, English-born fantasy and mystery writer (d. 2014)
 September 18 – John Jacob Rhodes, American politician and lawyer (d. 2003)
 September 21 – Zinovy Gerdt, Russian actor (d. 1996)
 September 23 – Aldo Moro, 38th Prime Minister of Italy (d. 1978)
 September 24 – Ruth Leach Amonette, American businesswoman (d. 2004)
 September 27
 Frank Handlen, American artist
 Trento Longaretti, Italian painter (d. 2017)
 S. Yizhar (aka Yizhar Smilansky), Israeli author (d. 2006)
 September 28 – Peter Finch, English-born Australian actor (d. 1977)

October 

 October 2 – Jim L. Gillis Jr., American politician (d. 2018)
 October 3
 Frank Pantridge, Irish physician and inventor (d. 2004) 
 James Herriot, English veterinarian and author (d. 1995)
 Shelby Storck, American television producer (d. 1969)
 October 4 – Vitaly Ginzburg, Russian physicist, Nobel laureate (d. 2009)
 October 7 – Sir Hereward Wake, 14th Baronet, British army officer (d. 2017)
 October 9 – Robert Brubaker, American actor (d. 2010)
 October 10 
 Bernard Heuvelmans, Belgian-French cryptozoologist (d. 2001)
 Sumiko Mizukubo, Japanese actress 
 October 11 – Maurice Gaffney, Irish barrister (d. 2016)
 October 12 – Alice Childress, American actress, playwright, and novelist  (d. 1994)
 October 14 – C. Everett Koop, United States Surgeon General (d. 2013)
 October 15 – Hassan Gouled Aptidon, President of Djibouti (d. 2006)
 October 19
 Jean Dausset, French immunologist, recipient of the Nobel Prize in Physiology or Medicine (d. 2009)
 Emil Gilels, Ukrainian pianist (d. 1985)
 October 21 – Eddie Carnett, American baseball player (d. 2016)
 October 25 – Thérèse Kleindienst, French librarian (d. 2018)
 October 26 – François Mitterrand, President of France (d. 1996)
 October 30 – Leon Day, American baseball player (d. 1995)
 October 31
 Phil Monroe, American animator and director (d. 1988)
 Carl Johan Bernadotte, Prince of Sweden (d. 2012)

November 

 November 4 – Walter Cronkite, American television journalist (d. 2009)
 November 5 – Jim Tabor, American baseball player (d. 1953)
 November 6 – Harry Blamires, British Anglican theologian, literary critic and novelist (d. 2017)
 November 8 – Lady Ursula d'Abo, English socialite (d. 2017)
 November 10 – Louis le Brocquy, Irish painter (d. 2012)
 November 11 – Robert Carr, English politician (d. 2012)
 November 12 – Rogelio de la Rosa, Filipino actor and politician (d. 1986)
 November 14 – Sherwood Schwartz, American television writer and producer (d. 2011)
 November 15 – Bill Melendez, American animator (d. 2008)
 November 16 – Daws Butler, American voice actor (d. 1988)
 November 17 – Shelby Foote, American historian and novelist, author of The Civil War: A Narrative (d. 2005)
 November 20 
 Hamida Habibullah, Indian politician (d. 2018)
 Evelyn Keyes, American actress (d. 2008)
 November 23
 Michael Gough, Malayan-born English actor (d. 2011)
 P. K. Page, Canadian poet (d. 2010)
 November 24 
 Forrest J Ackerman, American writer (d. 2008)
 Frankie Muse Freeman, American civil rights attorney (d. 2018)
 November 25 – Cosmo Haskard, Irish-born British colonial administrator and British Army officer (d. 2017)
 November 26 – Gerhard Unger, German tenor (d. 2011)
 November 27 – Chick Hearn, American basketball announcer (d. 2002)
 November 28
 Lilian, Princess of Réthy, born Mary Lilian Baels, English-born Belgian queen consort of Leopold III (d. 2002)
 Ramón José Velásquez, 44th President of Venezuela (d. 2014)
 November 29
 Evelyn Bonaci, Maltese politician (d. 2008)
 Helen Clare, British singer (d. 2018)
 Fran Ryan, American actress (d. 2000)
 November 30 – John C. Harkness, American architect (d. 2016)

December 

 December 1 – Wan Li, Chinese government official (d. 2015)
 December 2 – Nancye Wynne Bolton, Australian tennis player (d. 2001)
 December 5 – Hilary Koprowski, Polish virologist and immunologist (d. 2013)
 December 6 
 Kristján Eldjárn, 3rd President of Iceland (d. 1982)
 Pratap Chandra Lal, Indian military advisor (d. 1982)
 Hugo Peretti, American songwriter and record producer (d. 1986)
 December 7
 George Russell Weller, American salesman known for the Santa Monica Farmer's Market incident (d. 2010)
 John G. Morris, American picture editor (d. 2017)
 December 8 
 Richard Fleischer, American film director (d. 2006)
 T. K. Whitaker, Irish economist and public servant (d. 2017)
 December 9
 Jerome Beatty, Jr., American author of children's literature (d. 2002)
 Kirk Douglas, American film actor (Spartacus) (d. 2020)
 Esther Wilkins, American dentist (d. 2016)
 December 11 – Dámaso Pérez Prado, Cuban musician (d. 1989)
 December 12 – Maharaj Charan Singh, Fourth Satguru of Radha Soami Satsang Beas (d. 1990)
 December 12 – Anne Vermeer, Dutch politician (d. 2018)
 December 14 – Shirley Jackson, American writer (d. 1965)
 December 15 – Maurice Wilkins, New Zealand-born physicist, recipient of the Nobel Prize in Physiology or Medicine (d. 2004)
 December 16 – Birgitta Valberg, Swedish actress (d. 2014)
 December 18
 Douglas Fraser, Scottish-born union leader (d. 2008)
 Betty Grable, American actress (d. 1973)
 Franciszek Kornicki, Polish fighter pilot (d. 2017)
 December 19
 Roy Baker, English film director (d. 2010)
 Elisabeth Noelle-Neumann, German political scientist (d. 2010)
 John Crutcher, American politician (d. 2017)
 December 20 – Morrie Schwartz, American professor (d. 1995)
 December 21 – Arsène Tchakarian, Armenian-French resistance fighter (d. 2018)
 December 24 
 Ron G. Mason, English oceanographer (d. 2009)
 Cecília Schelingová, Czechoslovakian Roman Catholic religious professed, martyr and blessed (d. 1955)
 December 25
 Ahmed Ben Bella, Algerian politician, 1st President of Algeria (d. 2012)
 Graciela Naranjo, Venezuelan singer and actress (d. 2001)
 December 27 – Cathy Lewis, American actress (d. 1968)

Date unknown
 Saad Jumaa, 17th Prime Minister of Jordan (d. 1979)

Deaths

January

 January 1
 Max Bastelberger, German doctor and entomologist (b. 1851)
 Adán Cárdenas, Nicaraguan doctor and politician, 16th President of Nicaragua (b. 1836)
 January 2 
 Joseph Rucker Lamar, Associate Justice of the Supreme Court of the United States (b. 1857)
 Félix Sardà y Salvany, Spanish Roman Catholic priest and writer (b. 1844)
 January 5 – Ulpiano Checa, Spanish painter, sculptor and illustrator (b. 1860)
 January 7 – Andrés Baquero, Spanish teacher and writer (b. 1853)
 January 8 
 Rembrandt Bugatti, Italian sculptor (b. 1884)
 Eugene W. Hilgard, German-born American soil scientist (b. 1833)
 January 9 – Ada Rehan, Irish-born American Shakespearean actress (b. 1859)
 January 10 – Guido Baccelli, Italian physician (b. 1830)
 January 11
 Cyril VIII Geha, Greek Catholic patriarch (b. 1840)
 Takashima Tomonosuke, Japanese general (b. 1844)
 January 12
 Léon Autonne, French engineer and mathematician (b. 1859)
 Georgios Theotokis, Greek politician, Prime Minister of Greece (b. 1844)
 January 13
 George Bengescu-Dabija, Wallachian-born Romanian poet, playwright, and general (b. 1844)
 Vasile Hossu, Romanian Orthodox priest and bishop (b. 1866)
 Victoriano Huerta, Mexican general and statesman, 35th President of Mexico (b. 1850)
 January 14 – Otto Ammon, German anthropologist (b. 1842)
 January 15 – Vojtech Alexander, Slovakian radiologist (b. 1857)
 January 16
 Arnold Aletrino, Dutch physician (b. 1858)
 William Montrose Graham Jr., American general (b. 1834)
 Juana María Condesa Lluch, Spanish Roman Catholic religious professed and blessed (b. 1862)
 January 17 – Arthur V. Johnson, American actor and director (b. 1876)
 January 18 – Lorenzo Latorre, Uruguayan officer and politician, 11th President of Uruguay (b. 1844)
 January 19
 Dora Knowlton Ranous, American actress, author and translator (b. 1859)
 Antoine Simon, French composer (b. 1850)
 January 20 – Ephraim Francis Baldwin, American architect (b. 1837)
 January 30 – Sir Clements Markham, British explorer and geographer (b. 1830)

February 

 February 3 – Metropolitan Ioan Mețianu, Romanian cleric (b. 1828)
 February 6
 Rubén Darío, Nicaraguan writer (b. 1867)
 Isala Van Diest, Belgian physician (b. 1842)
 February 7
 Franklin E. Brooks, U.S. House of Representatives from Colorado (b. 1847)
 Ludwika Szczęsna, Polish Roman Catholic nun and blessed (b. 1863)
 February 9 – Anton Yegorovich von Saltza, Russian general (b. 1843)
 February 12 – Richard Dedekind, German mathematician (b. 1831)
 February 13
 Vilhelm Hammershøi, Danish painter (b. 1864)
 Carlos Antonio Mendoza, Panamanian politician, acting President of Panama (b. 1856)
 February 18 – Hans Schmidt, German Roman Catholic priest (executed) (b. 1881)
 February 19 – Ernst Mach, Austrian physicist and philosopher (b. 1838)
 February 20 – Klas Pontus Arnoldson, Swedish writer and pacifist, recipient of the Nobel Peace Prize (b. 1844)
 February 21 – Karl Begas, German sculptor (b. 1845) 
 February 23
 Jabez Balfour, English businessman (b. 1843)
 Domenico Lovisato, Italian geologist (b. 1842)
 Hugo von Pohl, German admiral (b. 1855)
 February 25 – David Bowman, Australian politician (b. 1860)
 February 26 – Tomasa Ortiz Real, Spanish Roman Catholic religious professed and blessed (b. 1842)
 February 27 – Ugo Balzani, Italian historian (b. 1847)
 February 28 – Henry James, American writer (b. 1843)

March

 March 2 – Elisabeth of Wied, Queen consort of Romania (b. 1843)
 March 4 
 Franz Marc, German Expressionist painter (killed in action) (b. 1880)
 William Sooy Smith, American Union general and engineer (b. 1830)
 March 7 – Fred Donovan, American baseball player (b. 1844)
March 9 - Arnold Spencer-Smith, British explorer, clergyman, and amateur photographer (b. 1883)
 March 11
 Florence Baker, Hungarian-born British explorer (b. 1841)
 Henry G. Davis, American politician (b. 1823)
 March 12 – William M. O. Dawson, 12th Governor of West Virginia (b. 1853)
 March 15 – John Beveridge, Australian businessman, Mayor of Redfern (b. 1848)
 March 16 – Thomas King, New Zealander astronomer (b. 1858)
 March 19
 John J. Davis, American politician, U.S. Representatives from West Virginia (b. 1835)
 Girolamo Maria Gotti, Italian Discalced Carmelite friar and Roman Catholic cardinal (b. 1834)
 Vasily Surikov, Russian painter (b. 1848)
 March 20 – Ota Benga, Congolese pygmy brought to America as part of an exhibition at the Bronx zoo (b. 1883)
 March 24
 Herman Gesellius, French architect (b. 1874)
 Enrique Granados, Spanish composer (ship sinking) (b. 1867)
 March 25 – Ishi, last known member of the Yana people (b. 1860)
 March 28 – Paul von Plehwe, Russian general (b. 1850)
 March 30 – Nakamuta Kuranosuke, Japanese admiral (b. 1837)

April 

 April 4
 Alfred Cogniaux, Belgian botanist (b. 1841)
 Max Lewandowsky, German neurologist (b. 1876)
 April 7 – Shigeyoshi Matsuo, Japanese businessman (b. 1843)
 April 11 – Richard Harding Davis, American journalist and author (b. 1864)
April 14 – Gina Krog, Norwegian suffragist, activist and editor (b. 1847)
 April 16 – Alexander Meyrick Broadley, British barrister (b. 1846)
 April 19 – Ephraim Shay, American inventor (b. 1839)
 April 21 
 Ubaldo Pacchierotti, Italian composer (b. 1876)
 John Surratt, suspected of involvement in the Abraham Lincoln assassination, son of Mary Surratt (b. 1844)
 April 27 – Prince Leopold Clement of Saxe-Coburg and Gotha (b. 1878)
 April 28 – Edward Felix Baxter, English recipient of the Victorian Cross (b. 1885)

May 

 May 1 – Lydia Zvereva, first Russian woman to earn a pilot's license (b. 1890)
 May 2 – Jules Blanchard, French sculptor (b. 1832)
 May 3 
 Patrick Pearse, Irish teacher, barrister, poet, writer, political activist, and nationalist (executed) (b. 1879)
 Thomas MacDonagh, Irish poet, playwright, educationalist and revolutionary leader (executed) (b. 1878)
 Tom Clarke, Irish republican, leader of the Irish Republican Brotherhood (executed) (b. 1858)
 May 4
 Lord John Hay, British admiral and politician (b. 1827)
 Joseph Plunkett, Irish nationalist, republican, poet, journalist, revolutionary (executed) (b. 1887)
 Hector Sévin, Italian Roman Catholic cardinal (b. 1852)
 May 6 – Hans Chiari, Austrian pathologist (b. 1851)
 May 8
 Mabel Beardsley, English actress (b. 1871)
 William Burnyeat, British politician (b. 1837)
 Éamonn Ceannt, Irish republican (executed) (b. 1881)
Aeneas Mackintosh, British Merchant Navy officer and Antarctic explorer (b. 1879)
Victor Hayward, British explorer (b. 1887)
 May 11
 Max Reger, German modernist composer (b. 1873)
 Karl Schwarzschild, German physicist (b. 1873)
 Tirésias Simon Sam, 16th President of Haiti (b. 1835)
 May 12 
 James Connolly, Irish socialist and political activist (executed) (b. 1868)
 Seán Mac Diarmada, Irish republican (executed) (b. 1883)
 May 13 
 Sholem Aleichem, Ukrainian Yiddish writer (b. 1859)
 Ján Bahýľ, Slovak engineer and inventor (b. 1856) 
 Margaret Benson, English author (b. 1865)
 Émile Petitot, French Roman Catholic missionary (b. 1838)
May 18 - Chen Qiemi, Chinese politician (b. 1878)
 May 19 – Georges Boillot, French Grand Prix driver (killed in action) (b. 1884)
 May 21 – Artúr Görgei, Hungarian military general and politician (b. 1818)
 May 23 – Vladimír Jindřich Bufka, Czechoslovak photographer (b. 1887)
 May 27 – Joseph Gallieni, French general (b. 1849)
 May 28 – Ivan Franko, Ukrainian writer and political activist (b. 1856)
 May 31 – Sir Horace Hood, British admiral (killed in action) (b. 1870)

June

 June 2 – Paul von Bruns, German surgeon (b. 1846)
 June 5 – Herbert Kitchener, 1st Earl Kitchener, British field marshal and statesman (drowned) (b. 1850)
 June 6 – Yuan Shikai, Chinese military official and politician, Emperor of China and 1st President of the Republic of China (b. 1859)
 June 7
 Alberto Elmore Fernández de Córdoba, Peruvian diplomat and politician, 52nd Prime Minister of Peru (b. 1844)
 Émile Faguet, French writer and critic (b. 1847)
 June 12 – Silvanus P. Thompson, English professor of physics, electrical engineer, member of the Royal Society and author (b. 1851)
 June 17 – Edwin Monroe Bacon, English writer (b. 1844)
 June 18 
 Max Immelmann, German fighter ace (killed in action) (b. 1890)
 Helmuth von Moltke the Younger, German general (b. 1848)
 June 22 – Tanaka Yoshio, Japanese naturalist (b. 1838)
 June 24 – Victor Chapman, French-born American fighter pilot (killed in action) (b. 1890)
 June 25 – Thomas Eakins, American realist painter (b. 1844)
 June 30 
 Russell Barton, British-born Australian politician (b. 1830)
 Eunice Eloisae Gibbs Allyn, American correspondent, author, and songwriter (b. 1847)

July

 July 1 – First Day on the Somme (killed in action)
 Eugene Bourdon, French architect (b. 1870)
 Gilbert Waterhouse, English architect and war poet (b. 1883)
 July 2 – Mikhail Pomortsev, Russian meteorologist (b. 1851)
 July 3
 Hetty Green, American businesswoman (b. 1834)
 Alfred Kleiner, Swiss physicist (b. 1849)
 Jeremiah Lomnytskyj, Ukrainian Basilian priest, missionary and servant of God (b. 1860)
 July 6 – Odilon Redon, French painter (b. 1840)
 July 7 – Margarethe Hormuth-Kallmorgen, German painter (b. 1835)
 July 12 – Cesare Battisti, Italian patriot, geographer and politician (b. 1875)
 July 15 – Élie Metchnikoff, Russian microbiologist, recipient of the Nobel Prize in Physiology or Medicine (b. 1845)
 July 16 
 Regino Garcia, Filipino artist (b. 1840)
 Sir Victor Horsley, English physician and surgeon (b. 1857) 
 July 20 – Reinhard Sorge, German dramatist and poet (killed in action) (b. 1892)
 July 22 – James Whitcomb Riley, American poet (b. 1849)
 July 23 – Sir William Ramsay, British chemist, Nobel Prize laureate (b. 1852)
 July 26
 Gustave Maria Blanche, French Roman Catholic priest and bishop (b. 1849)
 Johannes Ranke, German physiologist (b. 1836)
 July 27
 Arthur Winton Brown, New Zealander politician, Mayor of Wellington (b. 1856)
 Charles Fryatt, British mariner (executed) (b. 1872)
 July 29 – Claude Castleton, Australian VC recipient (killed in action) (b. 1893)

August 

 August 3 – Roger Casement, Irish nationalist (executed) (b. 1864)
 August 5 – George Butterworth, English composer (b. 1885)
 August 7 – Kittredge Haskins, American lawyer and politician, U.S. House of Representatives from Vermont (b. 1836)
 August 8
 Lily Braun, German writer  (b. 1865)
 Kamimura Hikonojō, Japanese admiral (b. 1849)
 Oscar Linkson, English football player (b. 1888)
 August 9 – Guido Gozzano, Italian poet and writer (b. 1883)
 August 10 – S. Isadore Miner, American columnist writing as "Pauline Periwinkle" (b. 1863)
 August 13 – Pierre de Ségur, French historian (b. 1853)
 August 17 – Umberto Boccioni, Italian painter and sculptor (b. 1882)
 August 18 – Marcel Brindejonc des Moulinais, French aviator (b. 1892)
 August 30 – Alexander Boarman, American judge, U.S. House of Representatives of Louisiana (b. 1839)
 August 31
 Martha McClellan Brown, American activist (b. 1838)
 John St. John, American temperance leader and Governor of Kansas (b. 1833)

September 

 September 2
 Gennady Ladyzhensky, Russian painter (b. 1852)
 Felipe Trigo, Spanish writer (b. 1864)
 September 4 – José Echegaray, Spanish writer, Nobel Prize laureate (b. 1832) 
 September 7 – Annie Le Porte Diggs, Canadian-born American activist and librarian (b. 1853)
 September 8
 Friedrich Baumfelder, German composer, conductor, and pianist (b. 1836)
 James Gray, American journalist, 19th Mayor of Minneapolis (b. 1862)
 September 12 – Zygmunt Balicki, Polish sociologist (b. 1858)
 September 14 – Pierre Duhem, French physicist (b. 1861)
 September 15
 Raymond Asquith, English barrister (b. 1878)
 Josiah Royce, American philosopher (b. 1855)
 September 17 – Seth Low, American politician and educator, Mayor of New York City (b. 1850)
 September 25 – Gerald Arbuthnot, British soldier and politician (b. 1872)
 September 29 – Albert John Cook, American entomologist and zoologist (b. 1842)

October

 October 3
 James Burgess, British archaeologist (b. 1832)
 Dmytro Yaremko, Ukrainian Eastern Catholic hierarch and bishop (b. 1879)
 October 6 – Isidore De Loor, Belgian Roman Catholic religious professed and blessed (b. 1881)
 October 10 – Antonio Sant'Elia, Italian architect (killed in action) (b. 1888)
 October 11 – King Otto of Bavaria (b. 1848)
 October 12 – Tony Jannus, American aviator and aircraft designer (b. 1889)
 October 18 – Ignacio Pinazo Camarlench, Spanish painter (b. 1849)
 October 21
 Olindo Guerrini, Italian poet (b. 1845)
 Karl von Stürgkh, Prime Minister of Austria (b. 1859)
 October 25 – Gérard Encausse, Papus, French occultist (b. 1865)
 October 28
 Oswald Boelcke, German World War I fighter ace, (b. 1891)
 Cleveland Abbe, American meteorologist (b. 1838)
 October 29 – John Sebastian Little, American politician and congressman (b. 1851)
 October 31 
Tina Blau, Austrian painter (b. 1845)
 Charles Taze Russell, Protestant evangelist, forerunner of Jehovah's Witnesses (b. 1852)
Huang Xing, Chinese revolutionary leader and politician, and the first commander-in-chief of the Republic of China (b. 1874)

November

 November 1 – Franz, Prince of Thun and Hohenstein, Austrian noble and statesman, Prime Minister (b. 1847)
 November 2 – Prince Mircea of Romania (b. 1913)
 November 3 – August Lindberg, Swedish actor, director and manager (b. 1846)
 November 4
 John Bingham, 5th Baron Clanmorris, Irish peer (b. 1838)
 Ella Loraine Dorsey, American author, journalist, and translator (d. 1935)
 November 5 – Francesco Salesio Della Volpe, Italian Roman Catholic cardinal (b. 1844)
 November 6 – Sultan Ali Dinar (b. 1856)
 November 8 – Prince Heinrich of Bavaria (b. 1884)
 November 9
 Ludwig Bruns, German neurologist (b. 1856)
 Ion Dragalina, Romanian general (died of wounds) (b. 1860)
 November 10 – Walter Sutton, American geneticist and physician (b. 1877)
 November 11
 Frank Chesterton, British architect (b. 1877)
 Francisco da Veiga Beirão, Portuguese politician, 53rd Prime Minister of Portugal (b. 1841)
 November 12 – Percival Lowell, American astronomer (b. 1855)
 November 14
 Franklin Ware Mann, American inventor (b. 1856)
 Saki, British writer (b. 1870)
 November 15 – Henryk Sienkiewicz, Polish writer, Nobel Prize laureate (b. 1846)
 November 18 – August Lindberg, Swedish actor, director and manager (b. 1846)
 November 21 –
 Chester Adgate Congdon, American mining magnate (b. 1853)
 Emperor Franz Joseph I of Austria (b. 1830)
 November 22 – Jack London, American author (b. 1876)
 November 23 – Lanoe Hawker VC, British World War I fighter ace, killed in action by Manfred von Richthofen (b. 1890)
 November 24 
 Princess Adelheid-Marie of Anhalt-Dessau (b. 1833)
 John Francis Barnett, English teacher (b. 1851)
 Sir Hiram Maxim, American firearms inventor (b. 1840)
 November 25 – Inez Milholland, American suffragist, labor lawyer, World War I correspondent and public speaker (b. 1886)
 November 27 – Émile Verhaeren, Belgian poet (b. 1855)
 November 28 – Martinus Theunis Steyn, Boer lawyer, politician, and statesman, sixth and last President of the Orange Free State (1896-1902) (b. 1857)
 November 30 – Demetrio Alonso Castrillo, Spanish politician (b. 1841)

December

 December 1 – Charles de Foucauld, French Roman Catholic religious professed, priest and blessed (b. 1858)
 December 2
 William Brownell, Australian politician (b. 1862)
 Hughie Hughes, British racecar driver (b. 1885)
 José Veríssimo, Brazilian writer (b. 1857)
 December 4 – Paul Allard, French archaeologist and historian (b. 1841)
 December 5
 Princess Augusta of Cambridge (b. 1822)
 Hans Richter, Austrian–Hungarian conductor (b. 1843)
 December 6 – Signe Hornborg, Finnish architect (b. 1856)
 December 8 – John Porter Merrell, American admiral (b. 1846)
 December 9
 Pierre Paul Leroy-Beaulieu, French economist (b. 1843)
 Natsume Sōseki, Japanese writer (b. 1867)
 Clara Ward, Princesse de Caraman-Chimay (b. 1873) 
 December 10 – Ōyama Iwao, Japanese field marshal and a founder of the Imperial Japanese Army (b. 1842)
 December 11
 Valentín Díaz, Filipino patriot, during the Philippine Revolution (b. 1845)
 Zoilo H. Garcia, Dominican engineer and aviator (b. 1881)
 December 12 – Edwin Atlee Barber, American archaeologist (b. 1851)
 December 14 – Nicolai Soloviev, Russian composer (b. 1846)
 December 15 – José Maria de Alpoim, Portuguese journalist (b. 1857)
 December 16 
 Friedrich Ernst Dorn, German physicist (b. 1848)
 Honorat da Biała, Polish Roman Catholic priest and blessed (b. 1829)
 Hugo Münsterberg, German-born American psychologist (b. 1856)
 Ognjeslav Stepanović, Serbian inventor (b. 1851)
 December 18
 George W. Cook, U.S. Representative from Colorado (b. 1851)
 Giulia Valle, Italian Roman Catholic nun and blessed (b. 1847)
 December 19 
 Doug Allison, American baseball player (b. 1846)
 Thibaw Min, King of Burma (b. 1859)
 December 22 – George A. Woodward, American general (b. 1835)
 December 25
 Albert Chmielowski, Polish Roman Catholic religious professed and saint (b. 1845)
 John Dunne, Australian Roman Catholic bishop and reverend (b. 1846)
 December 28 – Eduard Strauss, Austrian composer (b. 1835)
 December 30
 Grigori Rasputin, Russian mystic (assassinated) (b. 1869)
 Leopold Sulerzhitsky, Russian painter (b. 1872)

Nobel Prizes 

 Physics – not awarded
 Chemistry – not awarded
 Medicine – not awarded
 Literature – Carl Gustaf Verner von Heidenstam
 Peace – not awarded

References

Further reading
 Williams, John. The Other Battleground The Home Fronts: Britain, France and Germany 1914-1918 (1972) pp 109–74.

Primary sources and year books
 New International Year Book 1916 (1917), Comprehensive coverage of world and national affairs,  938pp
 
  Early Advertising, "Fishing for Suckers" at Duke University

 
Leap years in the Gregorian calendar